This article serves as an index - as complete as possible - of all the honorific orders or similar decorations received by the Kedah Royal Family, classified by continent, awarding country and recipient.

Sultanate of Kedah 
They have been awarded :
 late Sultan Abdul Halim of Kedah: 
  Grand Master of the State of Kedah Star of Valour (BKK, since 15 July 1958)
  Founding Grand Master and Member of the Royal Family Order of Kedah (DK, since 21 February 1964)
  Founding Grand Master and Member of the Halimi Family Order of Kedah (DKH, since January 1973) 
  Grand Master of the Kedah Supreme Order of Merit (DUK, since 15 July 1958)
  Founding Grand Master of the Supreme Order of Sri Mahawangsa (DMK, since 2005)
  Grand Master of the State of Kedah Star of Gallantry (BPK, since 15 July 1958)
  Founding Grand Master and Knight Grand Commander (SPMK, with title Dato' Seri) of the Exalted Order of the Crown of Kedah (SPMK-DPMK-SMK-AMK, since 21 February 1964)
  Founding Grand Master and Knight Grand Companion (SSDK) of the Order of Loyalty to the Royal House of Kedah (SSDK-DSDK-SDK, since 21 September 1973) with title Dato' Seri
  Founding Grand Master of the Order of Sultan 'Abdu'l Halim Mu'azzam Shah (SHMS, since 2008)
  Knight Commander (DHMS) and Founding Grand Master of the Order of Loyalty to Sultan 'Abdu'l Halim Mu'azzam Shah (DHMS-SMS-BMS, since 15 July 1983) with title Dato' Paduka
  Founding Grand Master of the Glorious Order of the Crown of Kedah (DGMK-GMK-AMK, since January 2001)
 late Tuanku Bahiyah (1st wife of the late Sultan Abdul Halim)
  Member of the Royal Family Order of Kedah (DK, 29.2.1964)
  Member of the Halimi Family Order of Kedah (DKH, 1.1976)
  Knight Grand Commander of the Exalted Order of the Crown of Kedah (SPMK, 19.2.1971) with title Dato' Seri
 Sultanah Haminah of Kedah (2nd wife of the late Sultan)
  Member of the Royal Family Order of Kedah (DK, 9.1.2004), 
  Member of the Halimi Family Order of Kedah (DKH, 16.7.2008) 
  Member of the Supreme Order of Sri Mahawangsa (DMK, 20.1.2017) 
 Tunku Intan Safinaz, Tunku Temenggong (Sultan Abdul Halim of Kedah and Tuanku Bahiyah's daughter and member of the Regency Council 2011) 
  Member of the Halimi Family Order of Kedah (DKH, 16.7.2008) 
  Knight Grand Companion of the Order of Loyalty to the Royal House of Kedah (SSDK, 28.11.1988) with title Dato' Seri 
  Grand Commander of the Order of Sultan 'Abdu'l Halim Mu'azzam Shah (SHMS, 12.12.2011) with title Dato' Seri Diraja 
  Justice of the Peace of Kedah (JP, 19.1.2004) 
 Tunku Soraya (Sultan Abdul Halim of Kedah and Tuanku Bahiyah's adoptive daughter) 
  Knight Grand Companion of the Order of Loyalty to the Royal House of Kedah (SSDK) with title Dato' Seri
  Grand Commander of the Order of Sultan 'Abdu'l Halim Mu'azzam Shah (SHMS, 17.7.2008) with title Dato' Seri Diraja
 late Tunku Abdul Malik, Former Raja Muda (1st younger brother of thelate Sultan and heir prince of Kedah)
  Member of the Royal Family Order of Kedah (DK, 21.2.1968), 
  Member of the Halimi Family Order of Kedah (DKH, 22.2.1976), 
  Member of the Supreme Order of Sri Mahawangsa (DMK, 12.12.2011)
  Knight Grand Commander of the Exalted Order of the Crown of Kedah (SPMK, 29.2.1964) with title Dato' Seri
  Sultan Badlishah Medal for Faithful and Loyal Service (PSB)
 late Tunku Annuar, Former Tunku Bendahara (2nd younger brother of the late Sultan and head of the Regency Council 2011):
  Member of the Halimi Family Order of Kedah (DKH, 16.7.2008)
  Member of the Supreme Order of Sri Mahawangsa (DMK)
  Knight Grand Commander of the Exalted Order of the Crown of Kedah (SPMK) with title Dato' Seri
  Knight Grand Companion of the Order of Loyalty to the Royal House of Kedah (SSDK) with title Dato' Seri
  Sultan Badlishah Medal for Faithful and Loyal Service (PSB)
 His second wife, Noor Suzanna, Former Toh Puan Bendahara, was awarded: 
  Knight Grand Companion of the Order of Loyalty to the Royal House of Kedah (SSDK, 12.12.2011) with title Dato' Seri
 Sultan Sallehuddin of Kedah (3rd younger brother of the late Sultan and member of the Regency Council 2011):
  Founding Grand Master and Member of the Royal Family Order of Kedah (DK)
  Founding Grand Master of the Supreme Order of Sri Mahawangsa
  Knight Grand Companion of the Order of Loyalty to the Royal House of Kedah (SSDK) with title Dato' Seri
  Grand Commander of the Order of Sultan 'Abdu'l Halim Mu'azzam Shah (SHMS, 17.7.2008) with title Dato' Seri Diraja
  The State of Kedah Distinguished Service Star (BCK)
  Mentioned in dispatches (KPK)
 His wife, Tuanku Maliha, Sultanah Kedah
  Founding Grand Master and Member of the Royal Family Order of Kedah (DK, 21.1.2018)
  Knight Grand Companion of the Order of Loyalty to the Royal House of Kedah (SSDK, 12.12.2011) with title Dato' Seri
 Their son, Tunku Sarafuddin Badlishah, Raja Muda
  Founding Grand Master of the Supreme Order of Sri Mahawangsa (DMK, 26.11.2017) 
  Knight Companion of the Order of Loyalty to the Royal House of Kedah (DSDK, 21.1.2007) with title Dato Tunku Abdul Hamid Thani, Tunku Bendahara (4th younger brother of the Sultan and member of the Regency Council 2011):
 Order of Loyalty to the Royal House of Kedah :
  Knight Grand Companion (SSDK, 17.1.2004) with title Dato' Seri
  Knight Companion (DSDK, 28.11.1991) with title Dato  Grand Commander of the Order of Sultan 'Abdu'l Halim Mu'azzam Shah (SHMS, 17.7.2008) with title Dato' Seri
 late Tunku Hamidah (eldest daughter of Sultan Badlishah of Kedah)
  Knight Grand Commander of the Exalted Order of the Crown of Kedah (SPMK, 17.7.2008) with title Dato' Seri
  Knight Grand Companion of the Order of Loyalty to the Royal House of Kedah (SSDK, 20.1.2003) with title Dato' Seri
  Companion of the Order of Loyalty to Sultan 'Abdu'l Halim Mu'azzam Shah (SMS)
 Tunku Hosnah (3rd daughter of Sultan Badlishah of Kedah)
  Knight Grand Companion of the Order of Loyalty to the Royal House of Kedah (SSDK, 12.12.2011) with title Dato' Seri
 Tunku Bisharah (4th daughter of Sultan Badlishah of Kedah)
  Knight Companion of the Order of Loyalty to the Royal House of Kedah (DSDK, 20.1.2008) with title Dato  Companion of the Order of Loyalty to Sultan 'Abdu'l Halim Mu'azzam Shah (SMS)
 Tunku Badriat (5th daughter of Sultan Badlishah of Kedah)
  Knight Companion of the Order of Loyalty to the Royal House of Kedah (DSDK, 20.1.2008) with title Dato'''
 Tunku Kamaliah (6th daughter of Sultan Badlishah of Kedah)
  Knight Companion of the Order of Loyalty to the Royal House of Kedah (DSDK, 21.1.2007) with title Dato
 Tunku Nafisah (7th daughter of Sultan Badlishah of Kedah)
  Knight Companion of the Order of Loyalty to the Royal House of Kedah (DSDK,21.1.2007) with title Dato
  Companion of the Order of Loyalty to Sultan 'Abdu'l Halim Mu'azzam Shah (SMS, 21.1.2002)

 Malaysia, sultanates and states 
They have been awarded :

 Malaysia 
 late Sultan Abdul Halim of Kedah, (twice as Yang di-Pertuan Agong, 1970-1975 & since 2011-2016) :
 Recipient of Order of the Royal House of Malaysia (DKM, 2.1971)
  Recipient (19.2.1959) and Grand Master (1970-1975 & since 2011) of the Order of the Crown of the Realm (DMN)
  Grand Master of the Order of the Defender of the Realm (1970-1975 & since 2011) 
  Grand Master of the Order of Loyalty to the Crown of Malaysia (1970-1975 & since 2011) 
  Founding Grand Master of the Order of Merit of Malaysia (in 1975 & since 2011) 
  Grand Master of the Order for Important Services (Malaysia) (since 2011)
  Grand Master of the Order of the Royal Household of Malaysia (1970-1975 & since 2011)
 late Tuanku Bahiyah, 1st wife of the late Sultan Abdul Halim: 
  Recipient of the Order of the Crown of the Realm (DMN, 19.2.1971)
  Knight Grand Commander of the Order of the Defender of the Realm (SMN, 19.2.1959) with title Tun Sultanah Haminah of Kedah, 2nd wife of the late Sultan :
  Recipient of the Order of the Crown of the Realm (DMN, 19.2.1971) 
 Tunku Intan Safinaz, Sultan Abdul Halim of Kedah and Tuanku Bahiyah's daughter 
  Commander of the Order of Loyalty to the Crown of Malaysia (PSM) with title Tan Sri Photo of the insignia of PSM
  Commander of the Order of Military Service of Malaysia (PAT)
 Tunku Soraya (Sultan Abdul Halim of Kedah and Tuanku Bahiyah's adoptive daughter)
  Commander of the Order of Loyalty to the Crown of Malaysia (PSM) with title Tan Sri Tunku Annuar, Tunku Bendahara (2nd younger brother of the late Sultan and head of the Regency Council 2011):
  Commander of the Order of Loyalty to the Crown of Malaysia (PSM) with title Tan Sri Sultan Sallehuddin of Kedah (3rd younger brother of the late Sultan and member of the Regency Council 2011):
  Commander of the Order of Loyalty to the Crown of Malaysia (PSM) with title Tan Sri  Commander of the Order of Military Service of Malaysia (PAT)

 Sultanate of Johor 
 Sultan Abdul Halim of Kedah : 
  First Class of the Royal Family Order of Johor (DK I, 9.1983)
 Tuanku Bahiyah, 1st wife of the Sultan Abdul Halim : 
  First Class of the Royal Family Order of Johor (DK I, 2.1989)
 Tunku Abdul Malik (1st younger brother of the Sultan and heir prince of Kedah) : 
  Knight Grand Commander of the Order of the Crown of Johor (SPMJ) with title Dato
 Sultan Ismail Coronation Medal of Johor (1960)
 Sultan Sallehuddin of Kedah (3rd younger brother of the late Sultan and member of the Regency Council 2011):
  First Class of the Royal Family Order of Johor (DK I, 30.10.2017)

 Sultanate of Kelantan 
 Sultan Abdul Halim of Kedah : 
 Recipient of the Royal Family Order or Star of Yunus (DK, 7.1959)
 Tuanku Bahiyah, 1st wife of the Sultan Abdul Halim : 
 Recipient of the Royal Family Order or Star of Yunus (DK)
 Sultan Sallehuddin of Kedah (3rd younger brother of the late Sultan and member of the Regency Council 2011):
 Recipient of the Royal Family Order or Star of Yunus (DK, 30.9.2017)

 Sultanate of Negeri Sembilan 
 Sultan Abdul Halim of Kedah : 
 Member of the Royal Family Order of Negeri Sembilan (DKNS, 8.1982)
 Tuanku Bahiyah, 1st wife of the Sultan Abdul Halim : 
 Member of the Royal Family Order of Negeri Sembilan (DKNS, 8.1996)
 Princess Intan Safinaz, Sultan Abdul Halim of Kedah's daughter 
 Recipient of the Royal Family Order of Yam Tuan Radin Sunnah (DKYR, 19.7.2005) 
 Sultan Sallehuddin of Kedah (3rd younger brother of the late Sultan and member of the Regency Council 2011):
 Member of the Royal Family Order of Negeri Sembilan (DKNS, 1.2018)

 Sultanate of Pahang 
 Sultan Abdul Halim of Kedah: 
 Member 1st class of the Family Order of the Crown of Indra of Pahang (DK I, 14.7.1987)

 Sultanate of Perak 
 Sultan Abdul Halim of Kedah : 
 Recipient of the Royal Family Order of Perak (DK, 5.1986) -- currently : 
 Tunku Abdul Malik (1st younger brother of the Sultan and Heir Apparent of Kedah)
 Grand Knight of the Order of Cura Si Manja Kini (the Perak Sword of State, SPCM) with title Dato' Seri Sultan Sallehuddin of Kedah (3rd younger brother of the late Sultan and member of the Regency Council 2011):
 Recipient of the Royal Family Order of Perak (DK, 11.2017) -- currently : 

 Sultanate of Perlis 
 Sultan Abdul Halim of Kedah: 
 Recipient of the Perlis Family Order of the Gallant Prince Syed Putra Jamalullail (DK, 6.1980)

 Sultanate of Selangor 
 Sultan Abdul Halim of Kedah : 
  First Class of the Royal Family Order of Selangor (DK I, 9.1978)
 Tunku Abdul Malik (1st younger brother of the Sultan) : 
  Second Class of the Royal Family Order of Selangor (DK II, 20.7.1989)
 Sultan Sallehuddin of Kedah (3rd younger brother of the late Sultan and member of the Regency Council 2011):
  First Class of the Royal Family Order of Selangor (DK I, 12.2017)

 Sultanate of Terengganu 
 Sultan Abdul Halim of Kedah :
  Member first class of the Family Order of Terengganu (DK I, 3.1985)
 Tunku Abdul Malik (1st younger brother of the Sultan) : 
  Member first class of the Family Order of Terengganu (DK I)

 State of Malacca 
 Sultan Abdul Halim of Kedah: 
 Grand Commander of the Premier and Exalted Order of Malacca (DUNM) with title Datuk Seri Utama State of Sarawak 
 Sultan Abdul Halim of Kedah :
  Knight Grand Commander of the Order of the Star of Hornbill Sarawak (DP, 4.1977) with title Datuk Patinggi Tunku Abdul Malik (1st younger brother of the Sultan and heir prince of Kedah) : 
  Knight Commander of the Order of the Star of Hornbill Sarawak (DA) with title Datuk Amar Asian foreign honours 
They were awarded:

 Far East 
 Brunei 
 Sultan Abdul Halim of Kedah (5th and 14th YdPA of Malaysia in 1970-1975 & 2011-2016) : 
 Recipient of Royal Family Order of the Crown of Brunei (DKMB) 

 Indonesia 
 Sultan Abdul Halim of Kedah (5th and 14th YdPA of Malaysia in 1970-1975 & 2011-2016) : 
 Collar of the Star of Mahaputera - 1st Class (Bintang Mahaputera Adipurna) - 1970
 Tuanku Bahiyah, 1st wife of the Sultan Abdul Halim: 
 1st Class of the Star of Mahaputera (Bintang Mahaputera Adipurna) - 16.3.1970

 Japan 
 Sultan Abdul Halim of Kedah (5th and 14th YdPA of Malaysia in 1970-1975 & 2011-2016) : 
 Collar of the Order of the Chrysanthemum - 1970
 Grand Cordon of the Order of the Rising Sun
 Tuanku Bahiyah, 1st wife of the Sultan Abdul Halim 
 Grand Cordon of the Order of the Sacred Treasure (29.2.1970)
 Sultanah Haminah of Kedah (2nd wife of the Sultan)
 Grand Cordon of the Order of the Precious Crown (3.10.2012) 

 Pakistan 
 Sultan Abdul Halim of Kedah (5th and 14th YdPA of Malaysia in 1970-1975 & 2011-2016) : 
 First Class of the Nishan-e-Pakistan (1974)

 Thailand 
 Sultan Abdul Halim of Kedah (5th and 14th YdPA of Malaysia in 1970-1975 & 2011-2016) : 
 Knight of the Most Auspicious Order of the Rajamitrabhorn (1 February 1973)
 Knight of the Most Illustrious Order of the Royal House of Chakri (2 September 2013) 
 Tuanku Bahiyah, 1st wife of the Sultan Abdul Halim: 
 Dame Grand Cross of the Order of Chula Chom Klao (1 February 1973)
 Sultanah Haminah of Kedah (2nd wife of the Sultan) 
 Dame Grand Cross of the Order of Chula Chom Klao (2 September 2013)

 Middle East 
 Imperial State of Iran 
 Sultan Abdul Halim of Kedah (YdPA of Malaysia in 1970-1975 & 2011-2016) 
 Collar of the Order of Pahlavi - 1971
 Recipient of the Commemorative Medal of the 2500th Anniversary of the founding of the Persian Empire (14.10.1971).
 Tuanku Bahiyah, 1st wife of the Sultan Abdul Halim: 
 First Class of the Order of the Pleiades (1974)
 Recipient of the Commemorative Medal of the 2500th Anniversary of the founding of the Persian Empire (14.10.1971).To be completed if any other... American foreign honours 
They were awarded:To be completed if any ... European honours 
They were awarded:

 Spain 

 Sultan Abdul Halim of Kedah (YdPA of Malaysia in 1970-1975 & 2011-2016)
 Grand Cross of the Order of Charles III (w/Collar) - 1974

 United Kingdom 

 Sultan Abdul Halim of Kedah (YdPA of Malaysia in 1970-1975 & 2011-2016)
 Honorary Knight Grand Cross of the Order of the Bath (GCB) - 1972
 Honorary Knight of the Venerable Order of St John (KStJ) - 1972

 African foreign honours To be completed if any ...''

References

Notes 

 
Kedah